Unforgiven is a 1992 Western film directed by Clint Eastwood and starring Eastwood, Gene Hackman and Morgan Freeman.

Unforgiven may also refer to:

Film 
 The Unforgiven (1960 film), a Western starring Burt Lancaster, Audrey Hepburn and Audie Murphy
 The Unforgiven (2005 film), a South Korean film
 Unforgiven (2013 film), a Japanese remake of the 1992 film starring Ken Watanabe
 Unforgiven (2018 film), a Russian film

Music 
 The Unforgiven (band), a country rock band that toured from 1985 to 1988

Albums
 Unforgiven (X-Raided album), 1999
 Unforgiven (Tim Hardin album), 1980
 Unforgiven (Cockney Rejects album), 2007
 The Unforgiven (album), a 1999 album by Michael Schenker Group

Songs
 "Unforgiven" (The Go-Go's song), 2001
 "Unforgiven" (Sevendust song), 2018
 "Unforgiven" (Tracy Lawrence song), 2001
 "The Unforgiven" (song), a 1991 song by Metallica
 "The Unforgiven II", Metallica's sequel song to "The Unforgiven", 1998
 "The Unforgiven III", Metallica's sequel song to "The Unforgiven" and "The Unforgiven II", 2008
 "Unforgiven", a song by Creed from My Own Prison, 1997
 "Unforgiven," a song by Sweetbox from Jade, 2002
 "Unforgiven", a song by Fefe Dobson from Fefe Dobson, 2003
 "Unforgiven", a song by Beck from Morning Phase, 2014

Other uses
 WWE Unforgiven, a former annual pay-per-view event held by WWE
 Unforgiven (TV series), a 2009 three part ITV drama starring Suranne Jones
 "Unforgiven" (Supernatural), an episode of the television series Supernatural
 "Unforgiven" (Once Upon a Time), an episode from the fourth season of the television series Once Upon a Time
 A white nationalist prison gang in Florida

See also
 The Unforgiving, a 2011 album by Within Temptation